Filipeștii de Târg is a commune in Prahova County, Muntenia, Romania. It is composed of three villages: Brătășanca, Filipeștii de Târg and Mărginenii de Jos.

The locality was a town until 1950.

Natives
 Nicolae Constantin

References

Communes in Prahova County
Localities in Muntenia